Maritime Washington National Heritage Area is a federally designated National Heritage Area in the state of Washington. It encompasses nearly 3000 miles of the state's saltwater shorelines from Grays Harbor County to the Canadian border, and includes 18 federally recognized tribes across 13 counties. It aims to celebrate the cultures of both the indigenous peoples in their past and current forms, as well as the growth of maritime industry in the state.

The Maritime Washington National Heritage Area was established in 2019. It is administered by the Washington Trust for Historic Preservation. The Heritage Area is split into four geographic subdivisions: the Olympic Peninsula, Puget Sound, Northern Coast, and the Salish Sea Islands.

References

External links
 Maritime Washington National Heritage Area official website

National Heritage Areas of the United States
2019 establishments in Washington (state)
Protected areas established in 2019